Mumu is a French film directed by Joël Séria, released in 2010.

The screenplay, of a largely autobiographical nature, was written by the director from 1993 - a long planned project for Séria who had not directed a full-length film since 1987.

Plot
In 1947, Roger Lantier, 11 years old, is expelled, again, from his school - to the despair and anger of his father. He goes next to a new school where 'Mumu' holds sway, "the meanest teacher in the department". This meeting is one that will leave its mark on the young student forever.

Cast
 Sylvie Testud as Mlle. Mulard ("Mumu"), teacher
 Balthazar Dejean de la Bâtie as Roger Lantier
 Jean-François Balmer as priest
 Bruno Lochet as 'Saucisse', the supervisor
 Dominique Pinon as father of Roger
 Prune Lichtle as mother of Roger
 Michel Galabru as Gâtineau, an old actor
 Valentin Ferey as Perchard, best friend of Roger
 Helena Noguerra as Madame Rotaillot
 Antoine de Caunes as the blind colonel

References

External links
 

2010 films
French comedy-drama films
2010s French-language films
2010s French films